Sung Ho-yeung (born 8 January 1999) is a South Korean footballer currently playing as a winger for Busan IPark.

Career statistics

Club

References

1999 births
Living people
South Korean footballers
Association football midfielders
K League 2 players
Busan IPark players